Victor Emmanuel Gatto (born April 24, 1947) is a former American football player and coach.  He served as the head football coach at Bates College (1973–1977), Tufts University (1978–1984), and Davidson College (1985–1989), compiling a career college football record of 52–92–4.  Gatto played college football as a halfback at Harvard University from 1966 to 1968.  He won the Nils V. "Swede" Nelson Award in 1968 and was the team captain in the legendary "Harvard Beats Yale 29-29" game and appears in the 2008 documentary film about this game.  Prior to being hired at Bates, Gatto coached football, baseball, and lacrosse at the Middlesex School in Concord, Massachusetts.

Head coaching record

College football

References

External links
 

1947 births
Living people
American football halfbacks
Bates Bobcats football coaches
Davidson Wildcats football coaches
Harvard Crimson football players
Tufts Jumbos football coaches
High school baseball coaches in the United States
High school football coaches in Massachusetts
High school lacrosse coaches in the United States